Gretchen McCord (sometimes Gretchen McCord Hoffmann or Gretchen McCord DeFlorio) is an American librarian and lawyer specialising in copyright issues in libraries. McCord is also known for the widely held book Copyright in cyberspace : questions and answers for librarians

McCord was an academic librarian and rose to President of the Texas Library Association before going to law school. She is currently (2014) Special Council to the Association.

She has a  B.A. from Rice University in Houston, Master of Science in Information Systems from University of North Texas and a Juris Doctor from University of Texas School of Law.

Books
Copyright in cyberspace: questions and answers for librarians Gretchen McCord Hoffmann, 2001. 
Copyright in cyberspace 2: questions and answers for librarians Gretchen McCord Hoffmann, 2005. 
What you need to know about privacy law: a guide for librarians and educators Gretchen McCord, 2013.

See also
 Interview at Library Juice

References

People from Texas
American librarians
American women librarians
Rice University alumni
University of North Texas alumni
Living people
American lawyers
Year of birth missing (living people)
21st-century American women